Axinoptera ruficosta is a moth in the family Geometridae. It is found on Borneo. The habitat consists of lower and upper montane forests.

The length of the forewings is about 6 mm for males and 7 mm for females.

References

Moths described in 1997
Eupitheciini
Moths of Indonesia